Andrew van Ruyven (born 9 September 1952) is a Canadian rower. He competed at the 1972 Summer Olympics and the 1976 Summer Olympics.

References

External links
 

1952 births
Living people
Canadian male rowers
Olympic rowers of Canada
Rowers at the 1972 Summer Olympics
Rowers at the 1976 Summer Olympics
Rowers from St. Catharines
Pan American Games medalists in rowing
Pan American Games gold medalists for Canada
Rowers at the 1975 Pan American Games